In July 2022 the Scotland rugby union team toured Argentina. It was the first time since 2010 that Scotland returned to tour Argentina, and the first time since 2018 the two teams had met. Before the series had begun both teams were equal on a head-to-head record of 9–9. However Scotland had a current five game win-streak over Argentina, the most Scotland had accrued over them in their eighteen meetings. Moreover, Argentina had not beaten Scotland since their meeting in the 2011 Rugby World Cup in New Zealand.

Furthermore, on the World Rugby Rankings Scotland sat seventh and Argentina eighth, respectively. As Argentina had the "home advantage" they would sit above Scotland when calculating the point distribution depending on the result.

Argentina's series win is the first time they had won a home test-series since beating Ireland 2–0 in 2007. It was also Argentina's first series win over Scotland since their first series in 1994 (2–0).  

The Scotland captain for the first two matches was Grant Gilchrist. The squad was significantly changed before the third test, leading to Hamish Watson taking over the captaincy for the last match.

Fixtures

Matches

Scotland A test

Notes:
 Despite not being a full capped test-match, this was the first time these two teams have played each other.
 This is the first time that Chile has hosted a Tier 1 nation (outside of any competition) since hosting a France XV side in 2005.

First test

Notes:
 Tomás Cubelli (Argentina) had been named to start but withdrew ahead of the game and was replaced by Gonzalo Bertranou, who was replaced by Juan Imhoff on the bench.
 Joel Sclavi (Argentina) made his international debut. 
 This was Argentina's first home game since they played South Africa in August 2019, nearly three years ago (1,057 days since their last home game)

Second test

Notes:
 Hamish Watson (Scotland) earned his 50th test cap.
 Kyle Rowe (Scotland) made his international debut.

Third test

Notes:
 Lautaro Bazán and Ignacio Ruiz (Argentina) and Ollie Smith and Glen Young (Scotland) made their international debuts.
 Matías Orlando (Argentina) and Zander Fagerson (Scotland) earned there 50th test caps.

Squads

Scotland
On 8 June, Scotland named a 40-man squad for their Summer tour to South America with an 'A' fixture against Chile and a three-test series against Argentina. On 17 June, Adam Hastings and Huw Jones withdrew from the squad due to injury and Johnny Matthews joined the squad. On 29 June five players left the squad following their first fixture with the Scotland A side: Matt Currie, Jamie Hodgson, Damien Hoyland, Johnny Matthews and Ben Muncaster.

Coaching team:
 Head coach:  Gregor Townsend

Argentina
Head coach:  Michael Cheika

Notes

See also
 2022 mid-year rugby union tests
 History of rugby union matches between Argentina and Scotland

References

 
2021–22 in Scottish rugby union
2022 rugby union tours
2022 in Argentine rugby union
2022
2022